Shooting Livien is a 2005 American drama film written and directed by Rebecca Cook and starring Jason Behr, Sarah Wynter, Dominic Monaghan, Joshua Leonard and Ally Sheedy.

Cast
Jason Behr as John Livien
Sarah Wynter as Emi Jackson
Dominic Monaghan as Owen Scott
Joshua Leonard as Robby Love
Polly Draper as Rose Livien
Ally Sheedy as Brea Epling
Jay O. Sanders as Colin Livien

Production
Principal photography occurred in November 2003 in New York.

References

External links
 
 

American drama films
Films shot in New York (state)
2000s English-language films
2000s American films